Manitok Catherine Thompson (born 1955 Coral Harbour, Northwest Territories) is a politician from northern Canada.

She was first elected to the Legislative Assembly of Northwest Territories in a by-election held on May 8, 1995 held following the resignation of James Arvaluk. She served the Northwest Territories as the minister of Community and Regional Affairs, until the creation of Nunavut in 1999. In the 1999 Nunavut general election, she was elected as the first member for Rankin Inlet South/Whale Cove until 1999. She served as Nunavut's first female cabinet minister.

She retired from territorial level politics in 2004 and ran as an independent candidate in the 2004 Canadian federal election in Nunavut riding. She finished second.

External links
Rankin Inlet South/Whale Cove profile, copy archived April 19, 2004
Manitok Catherine Thompson biography, copy archived March 23, 2007

1955 births
Members of the Legislative Assembly of the Northwest Territories
Members of the Legislative Assembly of Nunavut
Living people
Independent candidates in the 2004 Canadian federal election
Inuit politicians
Women MLAs in Nunavut
21st-century Canadian women politicians 
Women MLAs in the Northwest Territories
Canadian Inuit women
People from Rankin Inlet
Women government ministers of Canada
Members of the Executive Council of the Northwest Territories
Members of the Executive Council of Nunavut
Inuit from the Northwest Territories
Inuit from Nunavut
Nunavut candidates for Member of Parliament